Maria Bolognesi (21 October 1924 – 30 January 1980) was an Italian Catholic. Throughout her life she suffered from debilitating diseases and was reportedly subject to various demonic possessions and visions. Her numerous visions were of Jesus Christ and through him saw Heaven while also receiving the stigmata herself.

Bolognesi was beatified on 7 September 2013 and Cardinal Angelo Amato presided over the beatification on the behalf of Pope Francis. The beatification cause opened under Pope John Paul II in 1992 while Pope Benedict XVI had named her as Venerable in mid-2012.

Life
Maria Bolognesi was born as Maria Semiolo on 21 October 1924 in Rovigo to Giuseppe Samiolo. Her natural father - himself illegitimate - did not want to wed her mother and split from her which left Bolognesi to live until 1929 in her mother's home with her mother's name. Her maternal grandmother Cornetto Cesira was perhaps the most influential individual in her childhood in terms of instilling in the girl a religious education and love for God. Bolognesi received the name of her stepfather after her mother married Giuseppe Bolognesi in 1929; the pair went to live with him. Her step-grandfather was Luigi Bolognesi.

In 1932 she ran a high fever and her mother at the same time had contracted meningitis and was on her deathbed. Bolognesi had begun to prepare for her First Communion at this time and the nun that was instructing her at the time told her that Jesus Christ would grant her a wish. She wished that her mother would recover and she managed to recover from the disease; Bolognesi went on to make her First Communion on 22 May 1932 with much emotion.

Her stepfather often beat her mother due to his somewhat abrasive nature but he and her mother still had their son Luigi on 21 June 1940. In summer 1941 she received demonic possession and could not enter a church as a result with the blessings of priests failing to have an effect on her. She was at one stage even tied to a chair so that Santo Magro could bless her but this too failed. Bolognesi was taken to a mental hospital for evaluation but the Bishop of Rovigo Guido Maria Mazzocco blessed her from the window of his residence before she was taken there. The doctors later deemed her to be sane because she felt normal and was relieved of the possession.

She grew up in a poor household and was able to attend the first and second grade of her initial schooling while her peers often marginalized her. She dropped out of school as a child in order to work to support her parents and siblings and worked as an agricultural laborer in order to achieve this.

Bolognesi received her first vision of Jesus Christ in the evening of 1–2 April - on the occasion of Holy Thursday - bestowing upon her three rings and five rubies which was a representation of the Five Wounds. In the vision the Lord assured her that she would learn how to read and also promised her that her mother would turn from her sins - her mother began converting back to the faith on 15 March 1947. Around this time her spiritual director was the old priest Bassiano Paiato. On 8 May 1942 she had another vision of Christ. On 11 April 1942 she began to wear a black habit with the express permission of Paiato. Difficulties began to arise at this time for Magro became skeptical of her experiences and began to besmirch her in public to his parishioners. Difficulties escalated on 5 March 1948 when three male criminals attacked her while back on 27 February the Lord had warned her about this and told her that her guardian angel would be there with her. Bolognesi was knocked unconscious and was tied and muffled with flesh stripped from her legs and hands. She was left injured in the snow with two toenails almost torn off. Because people were skeptical of this the police sergeant took her to the magistrate and accused her of having faked the account though she was later absolved of these charges on 25 October 1948.

In the 1940s she began to suffer from arthritis as well as suffering from both colitis and appendicitis while almost becoming blind in 1950. For treatment she would often have to go to Rovigo and Padua. Her new spiritual director from 28 June 1951 was Rodolfo Barbieri and her first meeting with him was less than a month after. Bolognesi looked after orphans and assisted children whose parents were without jobs and would also make frequent visits to the sick in hospitals. In 1944 she gained the pierced wound on her side while in July 1951 suffering the pain of the Lord's flagellation; this culminated on 25 January 1954 when she wrote in her spiritual journal of a wound that had opened up in her right hand - the first signs of the stigmata. In August 1954 she resided with some Augustinian nuns in Ferrara and there received the wounds in her feet; she was hospitalized in February 1955 and had a vision telling her to leave Rovigo on 16 March. She went to a spiritual retreat in Sperlinga and received the left wound of the stigmata on 2 April 1955. En route back home from Sperlinga she stopped at San Giovanni Rotondo where she had a fever and her shoes full of blood. She found an inn and remained there and had a vision of Christ on Good Friday 8 April 1955 at 3:00pm.

Barberi's poor health led to Mgr. Adelino Marenga becoming her new spiritual director on 24 September 1956 and she met him in their first meeting on the following 14 October. Bolognesi received a vision of Christ again at 3:00pm on 1 November 1957 in which He took her to see both Heaven and Purgatory and in spring 1958 was bedridden until 1959. She visited the tomb of Gemma Galgani in Lucca on 29 September 1959 - to whom she fostered a devotion.  On 3 July 1959 she had another vision in which Christ said He would take her to Heaven and she saw it again on the following 6 July. She saw Heaven once again on 21 October 1959 at 2:00am in which she was roused from her sleep and then again on 22 January 1960. Marenga died in 1964 and her final spiritual director was Aldo Balduin.

Bolognesi suffered a heart attack in 1971. She had taken up painting in 1968 due to poor health that led to this heart attack. It was said that Padre Pio used to appear to her in bilocation in her Rovigo home, even appeared to her after the friar had died in 1968.

Bolognesi died due to a heart attack on 30 January 1980 at 2:00am and her remains were later transferred to the parish of Bosaro.

Beatification

The beatification process opened under Pope John Paul II on 18 February 1992 in which she was titled as a Servant of God after the Congregation for the Causes of Saints issued the official "nihil obstat" to the cause in which it allowed for it to open on a diocesan level. The diocesan process opened on 21 October 1992 and concluded its work on 8 July 2000 before the C.C.S. validated the process in Rome on 25 May 2001 and received the official Positio dossier from the postulation later in 2007.

The board of theologians met on two occasions on 19 February 2010 - in which another meeting was requested to discuss her writings and religious experiences - and on 24 June 2011 when definitive approval for the cause was issued. The C.C.S. met on 6 March 2012 and also approved the cause. On 10 May 2012 she was proclaimed to be Venerable after Pope Benedict XVI confirmed that she had lived a model Christian life of heroic virtue.

The process for the miracle required for beatification was investigated - the healing of a man named Marco - from 23 September 2004 until 13 December 2005 and was issued validation on 18 May 2007 before receiving the approval of a medical board on 5 July 2012; theologians also approved this miracle on 17 November 2012 as did the C.C.S. on 9 April 2013. Pope Francis issued the final approval needed to the miracle - and her beatification - on 2 May 2013. Bolognesi was beatified in Rovigo on 7 September 2013 and Cardinal Angelo Amato presided on the pope's behalf.

The current postulator assigned to the cause is Raffaele Talmelli.

References

External links
Hagiography Circle
Saints SQPN
Santi e Beati
Maria Bolognesi

1924 births
1980 deaths
20th-century Christian mystics
20th-century Italian people
20th-century venerated Christians
Beatifications by Pope Francis
Italian beatified people
Italian Christian mystics
People from the Province of Rovigo
Roman Catholic mystics
Stigmatics
Venerated Catholics by Pope Benedict XVI
Women mystics